Som Mittal is an Indian business executive with more than three decades of experience in the IT and automotive sectors. The Financial Express of India called him an industry "doyen."

Education and early career

Mittal received a bachelor's degree in engineering from Indian Institute of Technology Kanpur and a Master of Business Administration from the Indian Institute of Management, Ahmedabad. He began his career in the engineering and automotive industry serving at Larsen & Toubro, Escorts and Denso from 1975 to 1989.

Career in IT
In 1989, Mittal joined the multinational IT services and consulting company, Wipro, where he set up and grew the Peripherals Division and later was appointed to chief executive of the Server, PC and Services Division.

In 1994, he joined Digital Equipment India Ltd. (DEIL), Indian subsidiary of the American company Digital Equipment Corporation (DEC), as managing director. During Mittal's tenure with the company, it was acquired by Compaq Computer Corp in 1998 (Compaq acquired DEC and renamed DEIL to Digital GlobalSoft Ltd. post-acquisition). Compaq later merged by with HP in 2002. Mittal continued to oversee the company during and after the acquisition and merge. He was appointed as senior vice president of HP Services for Asia Pacific and Japan in 2006.

In 2008, Mittal joined the National Association of Software and Service Companies (NASSCOM) as the company's president. Prior to this, he had chaired Nasscom's board from 2003 to 2004. As president of NASSCOM, Mittal set up the Data Security Council of India which promotes data protection and develops best practices for security and privacy. Mittal stepped down from his position with NASSCOM in early 2014.

Awards and recognition
In 2013, the World Information Technology and Services Alliance (WITSA) gave him a lifetime achievement award for dedication to the growth of the Global ICT industry.  Other achievements include Business Leader of the Year by Rotary International and a distinguished alumni award from the Indian Institute of Technology Kanpur.

References

Year of birth missing (living people)
Living people
Businesspeople from Delhi